Do the Work is a 2011 non-fiction book written by American author Steven Pressfield.  It is the follow up book to his 2002 work The War of Art.  In it he again presents his theory of the enemy of creative works, 'resistance', that stops individuals from achieving their desired objectives.  He outlines the steps to overcome and defeat resistance to achieve artistic, athletic, business accomplishments that requires time and effort.

References

2011 non-fiction books
American non-fiction books
Books about creativity
Self-help books
Books by Steven Pressfield